Andrew John Stevenson (born 29 September 1967) is an English former professional footballer who made 104 appearances in the Football League playing for Scunthorpe United and Doncaster Rovers. He played as a defender or in midfield.

Career
Stevenson was born in Scunthorpe, and began his football career as a junior with hometown club Scunthorpe United. He made his debut in February 1986, aged 18, as a substitute in a 3–1 defeat at Port Vale in the Fourth Division. He established himself as a first-team player during the 1988–89 season, but according to a feature in the club's match programme, his "lack of a specified position may have counted against him" when it came to regular first-team football. He had a spell on loan at Doncaster Rovers in 1992, and was released at the end of the 1992–93 season.

References

1967 births
Living people
Sportspeople from Scunthorpe
English footballers
Association football utility players
Scunthorpe United F.C. players
Doncaster Rovers F.C. players
English Football League players
Association football midfielders